Neolissoceras is a genus of haploceratid ammonites with a smooth, compressed, flat-sided shell with a flatly rounded venter and distinct umbilical margin, from the Upper Jurassic (Tithonian) - Lower Cretaceous (Hauterivian) of southern Europe, Madagascar, and India.

References

 Arkell et al., 1957  Mesozoic Ammonoidea, Treatise on Invertebrate Paleontology Part L. Geol Society of America and Univ Kansas Press R.C Moore (ed)

Ammonitida genera
Haploceratoidea
Jurassic ammonites
Fossils of India
Tithonian first appearances
Early Cretaceous genus extinctions